Derobrachus leechi is a species of beetle in the family Cerambycidae. It was described by Chemsak & Linsley in 1977.

References

Prioninae
Beetles described in 1977